The 2001 Monmouth Hawks football team represented Monmouth University in the 2001 NCAA Division I-AA football season as a member of the Northeast Conference (NEC). The Hawks were led by ninth-year head coach Kevin Callahan and played their home games at Kessler Field. They finished the season 7–3 overall and 5–2 in NEC play to tie for third place. Monmouth's September 15 game at Robert Morris was canceled due to college football's collective decision to postpone games following the September 11 attacks.

Schedule

References

Monmouth
Monmouth Hawks football seasons
Monmouth Hawks football